Strepsodus is a genus of rhizodont lobe-finned fish that lived during the Carboniferous period. Fossils have been found in North America and Australia.

References 

Prehistoric lobe-finned fish genera
Carboniferous fish of North America
Prehistoric fish of Australia
Rhizodonts